State Route 655 (SR 655) is a state highway in Nevada. It begins at ramps 3 and 4 of the Patrick Interchange (exit 28) on Interstate 80 in Washoe County, running along old frontage roads 13 and 14 east and south to a bridge over the Truckee River into Storey County. SR 655 ends 0.054 miles into Storey County.

Route 655 is also known as Waltham Way.

Major intersections

References

655
Transportation in Washoe County, Nevada
Transportation in Storey County, Nevada